The Food and Drug Administration Revitalization Act was introduced by the 101st Congress of the United States. Senator Orrin G. Hatch was the chairperson sponsor of the federal revitalization amendment for the Food and Drug Administration.

The Title 21 amendment was signed into law on November 28, 1990, by the 43rd President of the United States George H. W. Bush.

Provisions of the Act
The Food and Drug Administration Revitalization Act of 1990 was penned with four legislative titles establishing a medium for the rejuvenation of the public health agency.

Title I: Administrative and Laboratory Facility Consolidation - 21 U.S.C. § 379b
General Services Administration provided authority to grant contracts for consolidated Food and Drug Administration facilities. The contracts shall be granted for the design, construction, and operation of consolidated Food and Drug Administration facilities.

Title II: Recovery and Retention of Fees for FOIA Requests - 21 U.S.C. § 379c
Charge fees shall be applied to recover reasonable costs incurred in processing Freedom of Information requests for records obtained or created under this Act.

Title III: Scientific Review Groups - 21 U.S.C. § 394
Technical and scientific review groups shall be established as needed to perform functions of the Food and Drug Administration.

Title IV: Automation of FDA - 21 U.S.C. § 379d
Agency shall automate appropriate activities of the Food and Drug Administration to ensure timely review of regulatory activities under this Act.

External links
 
 
 
 
 

101st United States Congress
United States federal health legislation
1990 in American law
Food and Drug Administration